Jón Guðmundsson (1904 – 1980) was an Icelandic chess player, three-times Icelandic Chess Championship winner (1932, 1936, 1937), Chess Olympiad individual gold medal winner (1939).

Biography
In the 1930s Jón Guðmundsson was one of the most promising young chess players in Iceland. He three times won the Icelandic Chess Championship (1932, 1936, 1937).

Jón Guðmundsson played for Iceland in the Chess Olympiads:
 In 1930, in the 3rd Chess Olympiad in Hamburg (+3, =4, -10),
 In 1937, at second reserve board in the 7th Chess Olympiad in Stockholm (+4, =5, -7),
 In 1939, at third board in the 8th Chess Olympiad in Buenos Aires (+11, =0, -3) and won individual gold medal for group "B", showing a hundred percent result in this group - 10 wins in 10 games.

After this success in 1939 Chess Olympiad, Jón Guðmundsson rarely participated in chess tournaments in the next years.

References

External links

Jón Guðmundsson chess games at 365chess.com

1904 births
1980 deaths
Icelandic chess players
Chess Olympiad competitors
20th-century chess players